Água Izé is a village on São Tomé Island. Its population is 1,255 (2012 census). It lies on the coast, 4 km northeast of Ribeira Afonso and 5 km southwest of Santana. The most notable landmark is Roça Água Izé, a former plantation complex. Most of the preserved buildings date from the 1910s.

Population history

References

External links

Populated places in Cantagalo District